Sussex Aerodrome  is located  southwest of Sussex, New Brunswick, Canada.

References

Registered aerodromes in New Brunswick
Transport in Kings County, New Brunswick
Buildings and structures in Kings County, New Brunswick